27 Air Defence Missile Regiment (Amritsar Airfield) is an Air Defence regiment of the Indian Army.

Formation 
27 Air Defence Missile Regiment was raised on 1 February 1942 by Major (later Lt Col) HT Hogan at Malir Cantonment (presently in Pakistan) as the 3 Indian Light Anti-Aircraft Regiment with the troop nucleus being of South Indian classes.

History 

At the time of its formation, the Regiment was equipped with Bofors 40 mm L-60 and American made anti-aircraft guns. 
World War II Various sub-units of the Regiment were deployed at Chittagong, Ceylon, Bombay and Calcutta. In 1945, the Regiment was moved to Vishakapatnam for training in amphibious assaults and was issued with the new 40 mm self-propelled guns. 
Post war Following the war, the Regiment was moved to Coimbatore. After the partition, the Regiment was transferred to India. It was renamed the 27 Air Defence Regiment in February 1965.

Indo-Pak War (1965) The Regiment was deployed for various air defence roles in the Western Sector. The gunners of the Regiment were decorated with 2 Vir Chakras, 2 Sena Medals and 5 Mention in Despatches. 
Indo-Pakistani War of 1971 The Regiment saw action in the Western Sector with their L-70 guns and was awarded the battle honour title of ‘Amritsar Airfield’  along with 3 Vir Chakras, 1 Sena Medal and 2 Vishisht Seva Medals.
Other Operations 
The Regiment has also participated in Operation Trident, Operation Rakshak I, Operation Rakshak II and Operation Vijay. During its participation in counter-insurgency operations, it was awarded 1 Sena Medal, 1 COAS Commendation Card, 11 GOC-in-C (Northern Command) Commendation Cards and the unit appreciation ‘’Kupwara-Kargil” by the GOC-in-C (Northern Command).
It took part in the relief and rescue operations in the 2001 Gujarat earthquake, for which the Regiment was awarded 1 COAS Commendation Card and 2 GOC-in-C (Southern Command) Commendation Cards. For its efforts in rescuing riot affected people during the 2002 Gujarat riots, the Regiments received 5 GOC-in-C (Southern Command) Commendation Cards.
The Regiment was awarded the Director General Army Air Defence's (DGAAD) unit appreciation award in 2005 and 2015.
The Regiment participated with its Akash surface-to-air missiles in the Republic Day parades of 2016, 2017 2018 and 2023.

References

Military units and formations established in 1942
Air defence regiments of the Indian Army
Air defence units and formations